The 1920–21 Harvard Crimson men's ice hockey season was the 23rd season of play for the program.

Season
Harvard received tremendous news before the season; the repairs to the Boston Arena were complete and the venue was ready to be used once more. With the Crimson now possessing a surface that could accommodate 7-on-7 hockey once more, as well as coach Clafin affirming his preference for the style, Harvard returned to its familiar style of play and began the season with a dominating win over King's College.

The results didn't change when Harvard began playing other US colleges and the Crimson ran roughshod over their competition. Jabish Holmes recorded four consecutive shutouts including matching 7–0 victories over rivals Princeton and Yale. The only thing that stopped Harvard from rolling to an undefeated season was a visit by the St. Patrick's Hockey Club of Ottawa, who won a pair of one-goal games in mid-February. Harvard seemed to take issue with the losses and thrashed their final two opponents, capping another championship season.

Princeton attempted to schedule a second game with Harvard at the Philadelphia Ice Palace but the Tigers were unsuccessful in their efforts. As a result the single game between the two had to stand for the season series.

Roster

Standings

Schedule and results

|-
!colspan=12 style=";" | Regular Season

References

Harvard Crimson men's ice hockey seasons
Harvard
Harvard
Harvard
Harvard
Harvard